The Primetime Emmy Award for Outstanding Animated Program is a Creative Arts Emmy Award which is given annually to an animated series.

In the following list, the first titles listed in gold are the winners; those not in gold are nominees, which are listed in alphabetical order. The years given are those in which the ceremonies took place.

Rules
Animated programs have the option to compete in broader program categories such as Outstanding Comedy Series, but cannot also submit for Outstanding Animation Program in the same year. The Simpsons, for instance, unsuccessfully submitted the episodes "A Streetcar Named Marge" and "Mr. Plow" in 1993 and 1994 while Family Guy was successfully nominated in 2009. Several animated programs won Outstanding Children's Program prior to 1979 and, in the years since, Rugrats, Winnie the Pooh specials and Star Wars Rebels have been nominated for that award.

Prior to 1989, all of the nominated programs were specials produced outside the confines of a running series. The category was divided into programs "one hour or less" and "more than one hour" from 1989 to 2009, with episodes of running series becoming eligible. Programs that are 15 minutes or less were given their own category, Outstanding Short Form Animated Program, in 2008.

Winners and nominations

1970s

1980s

1990s

2000s

2010s

2020s

Programs with multiple wins

11 wins
 The Simpsons (Fox)

5 wins
 South Park (Comedy Central)

4 wins
 Garfield specials (CBS)

2 wins
  Bob's Burgers (Fox)
 Futurama (Fox/Comedy Central)
 Rick and Morty (Adult Swim)
 Star Wars: Clone Wars (Cartoon Network)

Programs with multiple nominations

31 nominations
 The Simpsons (Fox)

18 nominations
 South Park (Comedy Central)

12 nominations
 Charlie Brown specials (CBS)
 Garfield specials (CBS)

11 nominations
 Bob's Burgers (Fox)

8 nominations
 Futurama (Fox/Comedy Central)

6 nominations
 King of the Hill (Fox)

5 nominations
 SpongeBob SquarePants (Nickelodeon)

4 nominations
 Archer (FX)
 Dexter's Laboratory (Cartoon Network)
 Family Guy (Fox)
 The Powerpuff Girls (Cartoon Network)
 Robot Chicken (Adult Swim)

3 nominations
 As Told by Ginger (Nickelodeon)
 Big Mouth (Netflix)
 Duckman (USA)
 Foster's Home for Imaginary Friends (Cartoon Network)
 The Ren and Stimpy Show (Nickelodeon)
 Rick and Morty (Adult Swim)
 Samurai Jack (Cartoon Network)

2 nominations
 American Dad! (Fox)
 BoJack Horseman (Netflix)
 Camp Lazlo (Cartoon Network)
 Cow and Chicken (Cartoon Network)
 Rugrats (Nickelodeon)
 Star Wars: Clone Wars (Cartoon Network)
 Tiny Toon Adventures (CBS/Fox)

Total awards by network

 FOX – 15
 CBS – 11
 Cartoon Network – 6
 Comedy Central – 6
 Discovery Channel – 5
 ABC – 3
 Adult Swim - 3
 FX – 1
 HBO – 1
 Netflix – 1
 Nickelodeon – 1
 PBS – 1
 The WB – 1

Notes

See also
 List of animation awards
 Annie Award for Best Animated Television Production
 Critics' Choice Television Award for Best Animated Series
 Primetime Emmy Award for Outstanding Short Form Animated Program

References

External links
 Primetime Emmy® Awards
 Emmy Awards coverage on DigitalHit.com
 Primetime Emmy® Awards Historical Database
 Emmy Awards Online with Emmy news, nominees and winners

Animated Program (for Programming less than One Hour)
American animation awards